The 2006–07 Women's CEV Champions League was the highest level of European club volleyball in the 2006-07 season.

Group stage

Pool A

Pool B

Pool C

Pool D

Play-off

Final four
Zurich 24–25 March 2007

Final standing

Awards
 MVP:  Angelina Grün, Foppapedretti Bergamo
 Best Scorer:  Virginie De Carne,  Voléro Zürich
 Best Spiker:   Francesca Piccinini,  Foppapedretti Bergamo
 Best Receiver:   Milena Rosner,  Spar Tenerife Marichal
 Best Server:   Ekaterina Gamova,    Dynamo Moscow
 Best Blocker:   Anastasia Belikova,   Dynamo Moscow
 Best Setter:  Eleonora Lo Bianco,  Foppapedretti Bergamo
 Best Libero:   Esther López,    Spar Tenerife Marichal

See also
Men's CEV Champions League 2006-07

References

External links
Official website

CEV Women's Champions League
CEV Women's Champions League
CEV Women's Champions League